Saint-Gildas is a commune in the Côtes-d'Armor department of Brittany in northwestern France.

Population

Inhabitants of Saint-Gildas are called Gildasiens and Gildasiennes in French.

In legend and fiction
Breton legend connects Gildas with Brittany.
The first book by the Irish writer Julia Kavanagh, Saint-Gildas, or, The Three Paths (1847) is largely set in the village in the eighteenth century.

See also
Communes of the Côtes-d'Armor department

References

External links

Communes of Côtes-d'Armor